Richard Eastcott (baptised 1744–1828) was an English clergyman and writer on music.

Born at Exeter about 1740, he matriculated at Oriel College, Oxford, but did not take a degree. Ordained in the Church of England in 1767, he lived in the Devon area and followed musical interests. At his death in 1828 Eastcott was chaplain of Livery Dale, Devonshire, on the presentation of Lord Rolle.

Works
Eastcott was author of Sketches of the Origin, Progress, and Effects of Music, with an Account of the Ancient Bards and Minstrels, Bath, 1793. The book, which was well received, was constructed from the histories of Charles Burney and John Hawkins. There is a chapter on the state of English church music, in which the author deprecated the custom of writing fugal music for voices, on the ground that such treatment prevents the words from being properly heard.

An elaborate criticism of the book was in the Monthly Review, xiii. 45–50 (see also John Davy). At the end of his book appeared an advertisement of other works by the author.

References

Attribution

1744 births
1828 deaths
Clergy from Exeter
English chaplains
18th-century English non-fiction writers
18th-century English male writers
19th-century English non-fiction writers
18th-century English musicians
19th-century English musicians
English writers about music
18th-century English Anglican priests
19th-century English Anglican priests
Musicians from Exeter
Writers from Exeter